Thomas Stoll (born 11 May 1998) is a German figure skater. He represented Germany at the 2017 World Junior Championships in Taipei; he qualified to the final segment and finished 24th overall in Taiwan. He is the 2017 national junior champion and a two-time national senior medalist.

Programs

Competitive highlights 
GP: Grand Prix; CS: Challenger Series; JGP: Junior Grand Prix

References

External links 
 

1998 births
German male single skaters
Living people
Figure skaters from Berlin